John Alexander Charles Hamill ( – ) was a Major League Baseball pitcher who played one season for the Washington Nationals of the American Association.

Professional career

Washington Nationals
Hamill made his Major League debut on May 1, 1884 with the Nationals. He would go on to start all 19 games he played for Washington. He compiled an ERA of 4.48 with two wins, 17 losses and 50 strikeouts. Hamill played his final game with the Nationals on July 31, 1884. He had never played professional baseball prior to joining the Nationals nor did he play it after.

External links
Career statistics and player information at Baseball Almanac and Baseball-Reference.

1860 births
1911 deaths
Baseball players from New York City
Washington Nationals (AA) players
19th-century baseball players